The Premier Division of the Derbyshire County Cricket League is the top level of competition for recreational club cricket in Derbyshire, England, and is a designated ECB Premier League. The Premier League was founded in 2000 as a separate league from the Derbyshire County Cricket League, and at that time was called the Derbyshire Premier Cricket League. The two leagues amalgamated before the 2016 season, and the Derbyshire Premier Cricket League became the Premier Division of the Derbyshire County Cricket League. While most of the league's member clubs are from Derbyshire, there are also clubs from the Burton upon Trent area of Staffordshire, Leicestershire and Nottinghamshire.

Champions

Championships won

Performance by season from 2000

References

External links
 Official play-cricket website

English domestic cricket competitions
Cricket in Derbyshire
Cricket in Staffordshire
ECB Premier Leagues